Enrique Mansilla (born February 14, 1958) is an Argentine former racing driver born in Buenos Aires. He was a fierce rival and teammate of Ayrton Senna in British Formula Ford 1600 in 1981. In 1982 he drove in British Formula Three for West Surrey Racing, nearly winning the championship despite much of his funding disappearing due to tensions resulting from the Falklands War. In 1983 he competed in European Formula Two for Gresham Racing, but only managed to score two championship points. In 1984 he raced in several Can-Am races in a March and a Toleman. In 1985 he raced in 3 CART races for Hemelgarn Racing with a best finish of 9th in his debut at Road America.

After he retired from racing he became a gold and diamond hunter in Liberia and was kidnapped for five months during a civil war and held as "exchange currency". After he was released he stayed in Liberia and continued to work in the gold and diamond industries, before returning to Argentina. He currently works in motorsport in Argentina in many roles, including as a driver and team consultant, as well as running his own PMO Racing touring car team. He is also head of the Argentinian Porsche GT4 Championship.

Racing record

Complete European Formula Two Championship results
(key) (Races in bold indicate pole position; races in italics indicate fastest lap)

PPG Indycar Series
(key) (Races in bold indicate pole position)

See also
List of kidnappings
List of solved missing person cases

References

1958 births
1980s missing person cases
Argentine people of Spanish descent
Argentine racing drivers
British Formula Three Championship drivers
Champ Car drivers
European Formula Two Championship drivers
Formerly missing people
Formula Ford drivers
Kidnapped Argentine people
Kidnapped businesspeople
Living people
Missing person cases in Africa